Pirassununga is a municipality in the state of São Paulo in Brazil, with an altitude of 627 meters. The population is 76,877 (2020 est.) in an area of 727 km2.

Situated in the southeast region of Brazil, the city is home to many important institutions, one being the Brazilian Air Force Academy. All current and future officers of the Brazilian Air Force are trained here. Pirassununga is also home to Fort Anhaguera, which once hosted the 13th Mechanized Cavalry Regiment of the Brazilian army.

In addition to being an important region for the Brazilian military, Pirassununga is a hub for the agriculture and environmental sciences of Brazil. The University of São Paulo's Faculdade de Zootecnia e Engenharia de Alimentos (FZEA), which translates to the College of Animal Science and Food Engineering, is located in the city. Pirassununga is also the location of CEPTA, the National Research and Conservation Center of Continental Aquatic Biodiversity, which is associated with the Chico Mendes Institute, an important research and conservation center in Brasília, the capital of Brazil.

History 

Pirassununga was originally home to the Tupi people, an indigenous group in Brazil. They gave the city its name, which means "the sound of fish." Every December, the fish migrate upstream, causing loud sounds as they fight against the current.

Exports

Cachaça 
Pirassununga is home to three sugar cane distilleries, Pirassununga 51 Cachaça, Cachaça Sapucaia  and Pirassununga Cachaça. The most popular brand, Pirassununga 51 Cachaça, was founded in 1959, just one year after Brazil had won its first FIFA Soccer World Cup. Pirassununga 51 Cachaça became a household name in the country during the 70s. "51, uma boa ideia," which translates to "51, a good idea," soon became a phrase in popular culture. It wasn't until the 1990s that Pirassununga 51 Cachaça became an export to other parts of the world. Cachaça is used as the spirit of choice for Brazil's national cocktail, the caipirinha.

Tourist Spots

Waterfall Emas 
Waterfall Emas serves as a hydroelectric plant to power the city of Pirassununga. In addition to supplying the city with electricity, it is a local fishing and boating destination. Houses can be rented nearby for fishermen to be near the water. Around Waterfall Emas, one can find many restaurants serving the local fish, dorado.

References

External links
 Emas waterfall
 Cachaça Ride - Tourism

Pirassununga